Zuma Rock is a large natural monolith, or inselberg, an igneous intrusion  composed of gabbro and granodiorite, in Niger State, Nigeria. It is located in the west of Nigeria's capital, Abuja, along the main road from Abuja to Kaduna off Madala, and is sometimes referred to as the "Gateway to Abuja from Suleja". Zuma Rock rises approx.  above its surroundings.

Zuma Rock is depicted on the 1000 naira note.  It was used for a defensive retreat by the Gbagyi people against invading neighbouring tribes during intertribal wars.

Zuma Rock is very tall by the standards of Nigerian geography.  It is over four times taller than NECOM house (Lagos' tallest skyscraper, as of 1979) and it is taller than Aso rock and Olumo rock combined.

Notes

External links 
 World 66
 Abuja.net

Niger State
Natural monoliths
Rock formations of Nigeria
Inselbergs of Africa